Ioannis Christou (born 23 June 1983 in Kastoria) is a triple Olympian Greek rower , multiple Word and European Champion. He achieved 9 medals at World Cups in his career .He represented Greece at the 2008 Summer Olympics in the single sculls event, finishing in the 10th place. 

At the 2012 Summer Olympics, he was part of the Greek coxless men's four, which finished fourth, four seconds behind the bronze medal-winning American four.

He was again part of the Greek coxless men's four team at the 2016 Summer Olympics, taking the eighth place.

References

1983 births
Living people
Greek male rowers
Rowers at the 2008 Summer Olympics
Rowers at the 2012 Summer Olympics
Rowers at the 2016 Summer Olympics
Olympic rowers of Greece
World Rowing Championships medalists for Greece
Mediterranean Games silver medalists for Greece
Competitors at the 2005 Mediterranean Games
Mediterranean Games medalists in rowing
European Rowing Championships medalists
Rowers from Kastoria